Vincent William Shields (November 18, 1900 – October 16, 1952) was a pitcher in Major League Baseball. He played for the St. Louis Cardinals in 1924.

References

External links

1900 births
1952 deaths
Baseball people from New Brunswick
Canadian expatriate baseball players in the United States
Major League Baseball pitchers
St. Louis Cardinals players
Fort Smith Twins players
Independence Producers players
Major League Baseball players from Canada
Sportspeople from Fredericton